Agathodonta is a genus of sea snails, marine gastropod mollusks in the family Chilodontaidae.

They are only known as fossils.

Species
Species within the genus Agathodonta include:
 †Agathodonta dentigera (Deshayes, 1842)
Agathodonta elongata Vilvens, 2001: synonym of Clypeostoma elongatum (Vilvens, 2001)
Agathodonta meteorae Neubert, 1998 Clypeostoma meteorae (Neubert, 1998)
Agathodonta nortoni McLean, 1984: synonym of Clypeostoma nortoni (McLean, 1984)

References

Chilodontaidae